Theodore 'Ted' Sablay (born April 18, 1976) is an American musician, musical director and songwriter. He has been a touring guitarist and keyboardist for The Killers since 2006 and musical director for the band's live concerts since 2022.

Early Years 
Sablay was born in 1976 in Fond du Lac, Wisconsin, the son of Maureen and Nonito Sablay, a doctor. His father also played piano and while his mother loved pop music.  As a child, Sablay took 4 years of classical piano lessons before switching to guitar at age 12.  As an adolescent, Sablay, along with his older brothers, saw concerts by INXS, Steve Winwood, David Bowie and Tom Petty and the Heartbreakers.  Moving to Las Vegas in 1991, Sablay decided to become a performer after seeing U2 and Paul McCartney perform at Sam Boyd Stadium.  Educated at the University of Nevada Las Vegas, Sablay played in various local bands while in college during the 1990s, including Attaboy Skip with Killers drummer Ronnie Vannucci and Neon Trees bassist Branden Campbell and Expert On October with Vannucci and fellow Killers touring guitarist Taylor Milne.  Sablay completed his studies at UNLV with a dual Bachelor of Arts degree in Anthropology and Asian Studies and a Master of Science degree in accounting.

Career

The Killers 
Sablay has played piano on "Romeo and Juliet" on the band's compilation album Sawdust, engineered sessions for the Killers' 2008 album Day & Age, worked as a music consultant on Flamingo, the 2010 solo album by Killers singer Brandon Flowers, and played lead guitar on "Dustland," the 2021 Killers collaboration with Bruce Springsteen.

Sablay has contributed bass to Vannucci's side project Big Talk and Flowers' second solo album, The Desired Effect. In 2017, Sablay was picked to fill in for Dave Keuning on lead guitar during live dates supporting the Killers' album, Wonderful Wonderful.

Solo career 

In 2021, while remaining a touring musician for the Killers, Sablay began his solo career, 
releasing the singles "Just Out of Reach" and "Fall Out of Love." In 2022, Sablay released his first solo album, You'll Be Back Here Soon, amassing over 500,000 Spotify streams as of October 2022. Las Vegas Weekly wrote that the album is “an impressive debut that warrants immediate, repeated plays.”  FV Music Blog described Sablay as "an outstanding talent," while Divide and Conquer Magazine gave the "You'll Be Back Here Soon" 4.2 out of 5 stars, describing the album as being "everything a rock record should be: well-constructed songs, accessible melodies, shifting textures and tones".. In its 2022 in review edition, Las Vegas Weekly named Sablay's song "I Only Care About You" as one of its favorite local songs of the year.

Musical Influences 

According to an official FAQ, Sablay's influences include The Beatles, The Rolling Stones, Paul McCartney, John Lennon, U2, The Smiths, Johnny Marr, Oasis, Noel Gallagher, The Kinks, Tom Petty, The Wallflowers, Sade, Paul Simon, Tom Waits, Talking Heads, David Byrne, Mark Knopfler, The War On Drugs and Supergrass.

References

External links
 Official site: www.tedsablay.com

1976 births
American multi-instrumentalists
American musicians of Filipino descent
The Killers members
Living people